Joan Humble (born Jovanka Piplica; 3 March 1951) is a British Labour Party politician, who was the Member of Parliament (MP) for Blackpool North and Fleetwood from 1997 to 2010.

Early life
Humble's first job was working in a delicatessen. Humble was educated at Keighley Girls (now known as Greenhead High School) and Lancaster University where she received a BA degree in History in 1972. She worked as a civil servant in the Department of Health and Social Security from 1972, before moving to the Inland Revenue in 1973. She left the civil service in 1977 to raise her two daughters. She served as a school governor for fifteen years from 1982. In 1985, she was elected as a councillor to Lancashire County Council where she served until her election to Parliament.

Parliamentary career
She was elected at the 1997 general election for the new Lancashire seat of Blackpool North and Fleetwood. She defeated Harold Elletson, the sitting Conservative MP for Blackpool North, by 8,946 votes. From 1998 to 2001 she served on select committees for social security, and from 2001 its replacement Work and Pensions. She was the chair of the All-Party Parliamentary Groups on Childcare, Social Care, Myodil & Army Deaths.

Although selected as the Labour Party candidate to contest the new constituency of Blackpool North and Cleveleys at the 2010 general election, Humble announced on 27 February 2010 that she would stand down at the election. At the election, the Conservative Paul Maynard won the seat on a 6.9% swing.

Personal life
She married Paul Humble in 1972 in Halifax. She is a Christian socialist.

References

External links
 Joan Humble MP
 Guardian Unlimited Politics - Ask Aristotle: Joan Humble MP
 TheyWorkForYou.com - Joan Humble MP

News items
 Consulting local people about wind farms in March 2007
 TVR closes in December 2006

1951 births
Living people
Members of Lancashire County Council
Labour Party (UK) MPs for English constituencies
Labour Friends of Israel
Female members of the Parliament of the United Kingdom for English constituencies
Members of the Parliament of the United Kingdom for constituencies in Lancashire
People from Skipton
People from Keighley
Alumni of Lancaster University
Alumni of Lonsdale College, Lancaster
Labour Party (UK) councillors
UK MPs 1997–2001
UK MPs 2001–2005
UK MPs 2005–2010
20th-century British women politicians
21st-century British women politicians
20th-century English women
20th-century English people
21st-century English women
21st-century English people
Women councillors in England